Suriname sent a delegation to compete at the 2008 Summer Paralympics in Beijing, People's Republic of China. According to official records, the country's only athlete competed in athletics. Suriname did not win a medal at these Games.

Athletics

Men

See also
Suriname at the Paralympics
Suriname at the 2008 Summer Olympics

References

External links
International Paralympic Committee

Nations at the 2008 Summer Paralympics
2008
Summer Paralympics